Rothpletzella is a genus of calcimicrobe known from the Silurian of Gotland, the Devonian of France, as well as the Ordovician of China. It has been hypothesised to be a cyanobacterium, and shares morphological similarities with extant cyanobacteria. The genus is named in honor of August Rothpletz.

References

Silurian life
Paleozoic life of Quebec
Cyanobacteria genera